Rosario Pergolizzi (born 7 October 1968) is an Italian football coach and former player.

Playing career
Pergolizzi, a defender, made his professional debut with Sardinian team Olbia Calcio; he then moved to Napoli, where he made a single appearance in the Serie A 1987-88. Pergolizzi then played for several minor Serie A and B clubs, including Ascoli, Bologna, Brescia, Padova and Ravenna. He retired in 2001–2002, after a single appearance with Olbia, then in Serie D.

Coaching career
Pergolizzi started his coaching career in 2002 as Giuseppe Pillon's assistant coach at Ascoli of Serie C1. The same year the club immediately gained promotion to Serie B. In 2003–2004 he followed Pillon at Bari.

From 2004 to 2005 he coached Serie C2 club Olbia, the same team in which he started and ended his playing career. In 2005, he was appointed to coach Palermo's youth squad. In his first season, he reached the semifinals of both the Campionato Nazionale Primavera and the Coppa Italia Primavera. In 2006–2007, he reached again the Coppa Italia Primavera semifinals, where his team was defeated by Juventus.

On 23 April 2007, following the firing of head coach Francesco Guidolin, Pergolizzi was appointed alongside first-team assistant manager Renzo Gobbo to coach Palermo for the five remaining Serie A league matches. He served for only three matches before being sacked himself and replaced by his predecessor Guidolin.

After a year without a job, in the summer of 2008 Pergolizzi took back his previous role as Palermo youth team coach. In his first season back with the Palermo youngsters, he guided the under-19 team to win the Campionato Nazionale Primavera for a historical first time, after defeating tipped favourites Juventus in the quarter finals, Chievo in the semi-final, and Siena in the league final. He left Palermo in June 2010 to get back into first-team coaching.

In June 2011 he was unveiled as new head coach of Portogruaro, who will take part to the 2011–12 Lega Pro Prima Divisione after being relegated from Serie B. On 18 July 2011 he was forced, in agreement with the company, to leave his post due to serious family problems.

On 26 October 2011, he was named head coach of Pavia. He resigned a few weeks later, on 5 December, due to poor results.

On 20 March 2013, he was named new manager of Ascoli, but he was relieved of his duties again on 13 April 2013.

He was successively reappointed at the helm of Ascoli in July 2013 after the club's relegation to Lega Pro, but resigned on 27 October 2013 after a 2–5 home loss to Lecce.

On 27 November 2014, he was named new head coach of Eccellenza Sicily amateurs Marsala. guiding them to promotion to Serie D by the end of the season. However, on the following 2015–16 Serie D season, he suffered immediate relegation on the final matchday of the season.

On 30 July 2018, he was named new Under-17 coach of Empoli for the 2018–19 season.

On 3 August 2019, he was unveiled as the new head coach of the refounded Palermo, that played Serie D in 2019–20. Palermo was promoted to Serie C at the end of the season as Pergolizzi left the club.

References

Living people
1968 births
Italian footballers
Italian football managers
Serie A players
Serie B players
S.S.C. Napoli players
Reggina 1914 players
Ascoli Calcio 1898 F.C. players
Bologna F.C. 1909 players
Brescia Calcio players
Calcio Padova players
Ravenna F.C. players
Footballers from Palermo
Olbia Calcio 1905 players
Palermo F.C. managers
Ascoli Calcio 1898 F.C. managers
Association football defenders